Tappen may refer to:

Places
Tappen Park, a park on Staten Island in New York City
Tappen, North Dakota, a small city in North Dakota
Tappen, British Columbia, a small city in British Columbia

Games
Tappen (card game), a 4-player, tarock card game, also known as Dobbm, played in Austria
Viennese Tappen,  a 3-player, tarock card game, also known as Tapp Tarock, played in Austria

People
Tappen (surname)

Other
Tappen (biology), an indigestible mass found in the intestines of bears after hibernation